The 2009 Ivan Hlinka Memorial Tournament was an under-18 ice hockey tournament held in Břeclav, Czech Republic and Piešťany, Slovakia from August 11–15, 2009. The two venues were Alcaplast Arena in Břeclav and Patrícia Ice Arena 37 in Piešťany. Canada captured their fifth championship in six years and fourteenth gold medal of the tournament overall, defeating Russia 9–2 in the gold medal game.  Sweden defeated the United States by an identical 9–2 score to earn the bronze medal.  The tournament marked the second straight year that Canada, Russia and Sweden medalled in that order.

Preliminary round

Group A

Group B

Final round

Seventh place game

Fifth place game

Bronze medal game

Gold medal game

Reference:

Final standings

See also
2009 IIHF World U18 Championships
2009 World Junior Championships

References

External links
2009 Ivan Hlinka Memorial Tournament on Hockey Canada

Ivan Hlinka Memorial Tournament
2009
International ice hockey competitions hosted by Slovakia
International ice hockey competitions hosted by the Czech Republic
Ivan
2009–10 in Slovak ice hockey